David Williamson (16 Nov 1868 – 30 March 1955) was a British editor and politician.

Electoral record

References

1868 births
1955 deaths
British journalists
Liberal Party (UK) parliamentary candidates